Nathan Boya (July 28, 1924 – August 8, 2022; real name William Fitzgerald) was the first African American to go over Niagara Falls. Very little is known about Fitzgerald. He claimed to be self-employed, but others have claimed he worked for IBM. On July 15, 1961, Fitzgerald went over the Horseshoe Falls in a metal ball he helped design called the "Plunge-O-Sphere". Performing stunts on the Falls could only be performed with permission, following the death of William Hill, Jr in 1951. Fitzgerald did not obtain a permit to do his stunt and was arrested and fined after completing it. After the flurry of appearances after his plunge, Fitzgerald did not make public appearances until 1985, when he attended Karel Soucek's funeral and in 1988 protesting discriminatory actions against a scientist he called "Dr. X".

Nathan Boya appeared as a contestant on I've Got a Secret on August 30, 1961. His secret was "I went over Niagara Falls in a 6-foot ball." Bill Cullen and Betsy Palmer questioned him. The other panelists, Henry Morgan and Bess Meyerson, recognized him. He was later a contestant on To Tell The Truth on an episode that aired January 15, 1962. Three of the four members of the celebrity panel (Tom Poston, Dina Merrill and Johnny Carson) guessed him correctly; Betty White did not.

Interviewed in 2012 for a National Geographic television special about Niagara Falls daredevils, Fitzgerald revealed his reason for his stunt after decades of silence: He had broken off his engagement to a woman that he felt he had wronged, and he performed the dangerous stunt as a form of penance. Niagara Falls had been their planned honeymoon destination.

Later in life, Fitzgerald moved to Bangkok, Thailand and authored two novels. A 1943 graduate of Kingston High School, Kingston, New York, at age 93, in 2018, he endowed a yearly scholarship in the names of his parents: Augustus and Sarah FitzGerald. Fitzgerald died on August 8, 2022 at the age of 98.

Bibliography

See also
List of objects that have gone over Niagara Falls
Jean Lussier, the first person to go over Niagara Falls in a rubber ball.

References

External links 
 Time Magazine
 How Stuff Works
 NG excerpt

1924 births
2022 deaths
African-American people
People who went over Niagara Falls
1961 in New York (state)
1961 in Canada